Billie McKay (born 11 July 1991) is an Australian cook, known for winning the seventh and fourteenth series of MasterChef Australia.

Early life
McKay was raised on a dairy farm in Bowraville, New South Wales and attended Macksville High School. Prior to competing on MasterChef, she was a restaurant manager in Ballina, New South Wales.

Career
She is best known as the winner of the seventh series of MasterChef Australia. Her prizes included $250,000, an Alfa Romeo Giulietta, and a monthly column in Delicious., an Australian food magazine. Following the final, guest judge Heston Blumenthal offered her a job at his restaurant The Fat Duck, which she accepted.

In 2019, McKay returned to MasterChef Australia's eleventh series as a mentor, sharing the position with season eight runner-up Matt Sinclair and the first series' runner up, Poh Ling Yeow. 

In 2022, McKay returned to compete on the show's fourteenth season, which featured a mix of returning contestants and new contenders. She won the title for the second time defeating Sarah Todd in the Grand Finale.

References

External links 

Living people
1991 births
Participants in Australian reality television series
Reality cooking competition winners
MasterChef Australia
People from the Mid North Coast
Australian television chefs